Krasnochetaysky District (Hĕrlĕ Çutay rayonĕ) is an administrative and municipal district (raion), one of the twenty-one in the Chuvash Republic, Russia. It is located in the west of the republic and borders with Yadrinsky District in the north, Morgaushsky District in the east, Alikovsky and Shumerlinsky Districts in the south, and with Nizhny Novgorod Oblast in the west. Its administrative center is the rural locality (a selo) of Krasnye Chetai. Population:  The population of Krasnye Chetai accounts for 15.5% of the district's total population.

History
The district was formed on September 27, 1944.

Notable people
 

Anatoly Danilov (born 1954), painter
Oleg Nikolayev (born 1969 in Cherbay), politician

References

Notes

Sources

Districts of Chuvashia

